Space Mountain at Tokyo Disneyland opened with the park on April 15, 1983. It was the first version of Space Mountain to open concurrently with the park. As with the other Space Mountains, this version is also popular with young adults and roller coaster fans. Along with its Walt Disney World counterpart prior to 2010, it is currently one of the only Space Mountains without an on-board soundtrack.

In 2022, The Oriental Land Company announced that the current version of the ride would close in 2024 and would be completely rebuilt, to open in 2027.

Versions

1983–2006

From its opening in 1983 and until late 2006, Tokyo Disneyland's Space Mountain was an almost exact clone of Disneyland's Space Mountain as it had opened in 1977. Apart from some outside architectural elements (such as the absence of the Space Stage and Peoplemover track) with the exception of both having the same shape and dimensions, the interior was the same, although there were some differences in the special effects (the tractor beam light on the second lift hill changed during the climb, and the re-entry effect was a blue hexagonal pattern). The track layouts, rocket designs, and original special effects and elements were the same as its Californian counterpart. Its sponsor is Coca-Cola and has its own pre-show. Also, the entrance to the attraction has a speedramp that guests ride to the upper level, where they enter the actual building, much like Disneyland's prior to its removal.

In the queue line, there is an "escape pod". It is a chicken exit that guests can get out of the line if they choose not to ride Space Mountain.

2007–present
The new Space Mountain has a more sci-fi futuristic look to it, similar to the refurbished Magic Kingdom 2009 version. There are new effects, as well as a new station which features a futuristic space ship hanging from the ceiling. The ride has changed but the effects are built on top of the original ride effects. Like its California counterpart, it now includes a hyperspeed tunnel at the end of the ride. Ever since 2009 for the Holiday season, The exterior at night became a light show while playing Christmas music in the background but the actual ride remains unchanged. The sponsor is unchanged but the logo & pre-show are. Unlike at Disneyland, the speedramp entrance remains.

In 2022, it was announced that the 2007 version of the attraction would close in 2024 in order to be completely rebuilt "with new performance and special effects". The new version of the attraction is planned to debut alongside a wider overhaul of the park's Tomorrowland area.

Statistics
 Grand Opening: April 15, 1983 (Opened with Tokyo Disneyland)
 Re-Launching Date:  April 28, 2007
 Designers: Walt Disney Imagineering
 Vehicles: 14 Rockets
 Vehicle Theme: Rocket
 Building Diameter: 200 feet (61 m)
 Largest Drop: 17 feet (5.15 m)
 Building Height: 118 feet (35 m)
 Track Length: 3,450 feet (1052 m)
 Volume: 1.8 million cubic feet (51,000 m³)
 Top Speed: 30 miles per hour (48 km/h)
 Height Requirement: 40 inches (1.02 m)
 Ride Duration: 2:45
 Ticket Required: "E"
 Ride System: Roller coaster
 Sponsor: Coca-Cola, Ltd. of Japan

Incidents

References

External links
Space Mountain at Tokyo Disneyland

Steel roller coasters
Enclosed roller coasters
Roller coasters at Tokyo Disneyland
Roller coasters introduced in 1983
Tomorrowland
Tokyo Disneyland
1983 establishments in Japan